Wuning Road is an interchange station on Line 13 and Line 14 on the Shanghai Metro. Line 13 opened on 28 December 2014. It became an interchange station with commencement of operations on line 14 on 30 December 2021.

Station Layout

Gallery

References 

Railway stations in Shanghai
Shanghai Metro stations in Jing'an District
Shanghai Metro stations in Putuo District
Railway stations in China opened in 2014
Line 13, Shanghai Metro
Line 14, Shanghai Metro